Auspitz is a Jewish surname. Notable people with this name include:

 Auguste Auspitz-Kolar (1844-1878), Bohemian-born Austrian pianist and composer
 Heinrich Auspitz (1835–1886), Jewish Moravian-Austrian dermatologist
 Gábor Péter, born as Benjámin "Benő" Auspitz (or Eisenberger) (1906–1993), Jewish Hungarian Communist politician
 (1838-1907), Austrian k.k. Major general and writer 
 (1859-1917), German theater actor and opera singer ( baritone ).
 (1803-1880), Austrian , Jewish surgeon and surgeon 
 (born 1975), Austrian film producer
Rudolf Auspitz (1837-1906), Austrian industrialist, economist, politician, and banker

See also 
 Auspitz's sign, named after Heinrich Auspitz
 Palais Lieben-Auspitz, Vienna
 Hustopeče, a Moravian town called Auspitz in German

References 

Jewish surnames
German-language surnames
Surnames of Czech origin
Yiddish-language surnames